A rogue star, primarily known as an intergalactic star, is a star that has escaped the gravitational pull of its home galaxy and is moving independently in or towards the intergalactic void. More loosely, any star in an unusual location or state of motion may be termed a rogue star.

In literature
Rogue Star, the third book of the Starchild Trilogy by Frederik Pohl and Jack Williamson
Rogue Star, the second book of the Firestar series by Michael Flynn
Rogue Star, a Warhammer 40,000 book by Andy Hoare
 "Rogue Star", a short story by Murray Leinster
 Gorath, a 1962 science fiction film produced by Toho about humanity’s efforts to move the Earth out of the way of a rogue white dwarf star

In business
Rogue Star Films, a South African film production company